Whitney Halstead (1926 - 1979) was an American art historian, and artist.

He graduated from the School of the Art Institute of Chicago with a B.F.A and M.F.A. 
He taught art history at the School of the Art Institute of Chicago.
His papers are held at the Archives of American Art.

Halstead was the primary supporter of the work of Joseph Yoakum and has been noted as an influential teacher by many of the Chicago Imagists and painters Barbara Grad, Paul Lamantia and David Sharpe.

References

External links
http://www.artic.edu/aic/collections/artwork/artist/6927
http://www.artic.edu/aic/collections/artwork/artist/6927

1926 births
1979 deaths
American art historians
American artists
School of the Art Institute of Chicago alumni
School of the Art Institute of Chicago faculty
20th-century American historians
American male non-fiction writers
20th-century American male writers